Nymph is an unincorporated community in Conecuh County, Alabama, United States.

History
A post office operated under the name Nymph from 1901 to 1927.

References

Unincorporated communities in Conecuh County, Alabama
Unincorporated communities in Alabama